Little Lake, California may refer to:
Little Lake, Inyo County, California
Little Lake, California, former name of Willits, California